Hypexilis is a genus of beetles in the family Cerambycidae, containing the following species:

 Hypexilis longipennis Linsley, 1935
 Hypexilis pallida Horn, 1885

References

Graciliini